The Nordic 10000m Challenge is an annual long-distance running competition over 10,000 metres between the Nordic countries: Norway, Sweden, Denmark, Finland and Iceland. The competition was established in 1997, the same year as the European 10,000m Cup.

The organising body, Nordic Athletics, has also encouraged participation of the Baltic countries: Estonia, Latvia and Lithuania.

Editions

References

Nordic 10000m Challenge. GBR Athletics. Retrieved 2018-05-22.

Nordic Athletics competitions
10,000 metres
Recurring sporting events established in 1997